Parvaponera is a genus of ants in the subfamily Ponerinae. The genus is distributed in Africa (and Madagascar), Southeast Asia, Australia and the Solomon Islands. Workers are slender and small in size. Queens are similar to workers, but larger and winged.

Species
Parvaponera cavimaculata Wang & Zhao, 2009
Parvaponera darwinii (Forel, 1893)
Parvaponera myropola (Menozzi, 1925)
Parvaponera sheldoni (Mann, 1919)

References

Ponerinae
Ant genera
Hymenoptera of Asia